Air Chief Marshal Sir John Alexander Carlisle Aiken,  (22 December 1921 – 31 May 2005) was a senior Royal Air Force (RAF) officer, and the Commander of British forces in Cyprus at the time of the Turkish invasion of the island in 1974.

RAF career
Educated at Birkenhead School, Aitken joined the Royal Air Force in 1941, serving in the Second World War in North-West Europe, flying Spitfires with No. 611 Squadron from 1942 and in the Far East as a flight commander with No. 548 Squadron flying Spitfires out of Darwin from 1944.

In 1948 he became an instructor at the RAF College Cranwell before becoming Officer Commanding Birmingham University Air Squadron in 1950. He was made Personal Staff Officer to the Air Officer Commanding-in-Chief at Fighter Command in 1954, Officer Commanding No. 29 Squadron in 1956 and a Staff Officer at Headquarters Allied Forces Northern Europe in 1958. He went on to be Deputy Director, Intelligence (Air) at the Air Ministry in 1960 before being appointed Station Commander at RAF Finningley in 1962. His next series of appointments were as Air Commodore (Intelligence) at the Ministry of Defence in 1964, Deputy Commander-in-Chief at RAF Germany in 1969 and Director-General of RAF Training in 1971. He was appointed as Commander, British Forces Near East/Air Officer Commanding-in-Chief Near East Air Force; and Administrator British Sovereign Base Areas, Cyprus, on 25 June 1973. He remained there throughout the period of the Turkish invasion of Cyprus, during which time he was responsible for organising the evacuation of several thousand foreign nationals from Nicosia and Limassol. He returned to the UK in 1976 and became Air Member for Personnel. He retired in March 1978. On retirement, he was appointed Director General of Intelligence at the Ministry of Defence from 1978–81. He was President of the Royal Air Forces Association from 1984–85, and 1987–88.

Aiken was appointed a Companion of the Order of the Bath in 1967, and raised to Knight Commander of the Order in 1973. He died on 31 May 2005, aged 83.

Family
In 1948 he married Pamela Bartlett; they had a son and a daughter.

References

|-

|-
 

|-

1921 births
2005 deaths
British military in Cyprus
British World War II pilots
People educated at Birkenhead School
Royal Air Force air marshals
Knights Commander of the Order of the Bath
Military personnel from Belfast
People associated with the University of Birmingham
Royal Air Force personnel of World War II
Turkish invasion of Cyprus